Italian musical terms may refer to:

Italian musical terms used in English
Italian music terminology